The soil-crack whip snake or crack-dwelling whipsnake (Demansia rimicola) is a species of venomous snake in the family Elapidae. It is only mildly venomous.

Description
The soil-crack whipsnake is front fanged and average about 49 cm in length. They are a slender grey to olive brown, presenting a dark band behind the head and a belly that is bright orange-red.

Distribution
Soil-crack whipsnakes can be found around Tibooburra and the Sturt National Park in far northwestern New South Wales.

Habitat and ecology
This snake is mostly diurnal, using flat rocks, fallen timber, debris, rock crevices, deep soil crack, grass clumps and animal burrows for shelter. they prefer biomes of open forests, woodlands or shrubland that have plenty of grass and shrubs to live amongst. they're main food source is small lizards and snakes which they chase and hunt.

Conservation
The soil-crack whipsnake is a vulnerable animal which faces a few major threats. Grazing and cultivation tend to destroy their habitat, soil cracks and fallen timber. Predation from foxes and cats can also become a major issue and, although they are of least concern, a lack of knowledge and management of these possible threats can quickly cause a decline in numbers.

Controlling pests such as goats, foxes and cats can help to stop predation as well as grazing from the goats. To regenerate and retain habitat, stock intensities can be reduced or exclude grazing to help vegetation regrow and cultivation should be restricted around remnant habitats. It is key to retain the grassland they live in which can be achieved by ensuring the full cycle of grass development such as seed setting and tussock formation. Stop the removal of stick and leaf litter, understory shrubs and fallen logs as habitat for the species, other types of habitat to maintain include species of Triodia and any nesting sites or food sources. These strategies are important to boost this species since it is still listed as vulnerable.

References

Demansia
Snakes of Australia
Reptiles of New South Wales
Endemic fauna of Australia
Reptiles described in 2007